Hieronymus Wilhelm Ebner von Eschenbach (born June 22, 1673, Nuremberg; died January 26, 1752, Engelthal) was a German diplomat, historian, scholar, and founder of the extensive private library Bibliotheca Ebneriana.

Family 
The Ebners were one of the oldest patrician families of the imperial city of Nuremberg, first mentioned in a document in 1234. They held seats in the city council since the 14th century and named themselves Eschenbach in the 16th–17th century.

Career 
Upon completing his study at the University of Altdorf, Hieronymus Wilhelm Ebner commenced a four-year education trip across Europe in 1691, visiting the Netherlands, Italy, Austria, Bohemia and northern Germany. Back in Nuremberg, he began preparing for a political career in 1700 and worked in various positions before he was appointed to the city council in 1708. He went on to assume the office of Scholarchat as the supervisor of the schools of the imperial city in 1718 and administered the office until 1744. Having worked on indexing of Nuremberg's public library and imperial city archives, he published some of what he regarded as the most important among the documents he had found in them.

Bibliotheca Ebneriana was built on many smaller collections he had acquired, such as the private library of his uncle Christoph Jacob Imhoff, which he had inherited in 1726. Gottfried Christoph Ranner's five-volume catalogue of Bibliotheca Ebneriana, published in the early-19th century, lists 18,512 titles divided into 11 sections, showing the extensive range and eclectic nature of the collection: encyclopedias; books on the history of Nuremberg, of the Holy Roman Empire, and of Europe; books on Christianity, geography, war history, and fine arts; and literature of Greece and Rome in antiquity, to name a few.

Legacy 
The Codex Ebnerianus, a Greek-language illuminated manuscript of the New Testament that is estimated to have been written around 1110, is named after him.

References

External links
 Bibliotheca Ebneriana: Volume 1 of Catalogus bibliothecae numerosae ab incluti nominis viro Hieronymo Guilielmo Ebnero, ab Eschenbach rel. olim conlectae: nunc Norimbergae a die II. mensis Augusti ann. MDCCCXIII publicae auctionis lege divendendae (in Latin) by Gottfried Christoph Ranner, 1812 — via Google Books

1673 births
1752 deaths
18th-century historians from the Holy Roman Empire
Diplomats of Bavaria
Politicians from Nuremberg
University of Altdorf alumni